Siruvachur is a small village located in the Perambalur district of Tamil Nadu, India. The village is home to the Mathura Kaliamman Temple and the Maariyaman Temple.

References

Cities and towns in Perambalur district